Montgomery County (county code MG) is a county located in Southeast Kansas. As of the 2020 census, the county population was 31,486. Its county seat is Independence, and its most populous city is Coffeyville.

History

Early history

For many millennia, the Great Plains of North America was inhabited by nomadic Native Americans.  From the 16th century to 18th century, the Kingdom of France claimed ownership of large parts of North America.  In 1762, after the French and Indian War, France secretly ceded New France to Spain, per the Treaty of Fontainebleau.

19th century
In 1802, Spain returned most of the land to France, but keeping title to about 7,500 square miles.  In 1803, most of the land for modern day Kansas was acquired by the United States from France as part of the 828,000 square mile Louisiana Purchase for 2.83 cents per acre.

In 1854, the Kansas Territory was organized, then in 1861 Kansas became the 34th U.S. state.  Montgomery County was established on February 26, 1867.  It was named in honor of Richard Montgomery, an American Revolutionary War general killed in 1775 while attempting to capture Quebec City, in Canada, after successfully capturing two forts and the city of Montreal.

When Kansas was admitted to the Union as a state in 1861, the Osage Indian reservation occupied a large tract of land near the southern border. The reservation had been established in 1825. After the Civil War ended, the Osage lands were coveted as the largest and last reserve of good land in the eastern part of the state. As early as 1866, the Osages were forced to cede tracts at the eastern and northern edges of the reservation. This treaty conceded white settlement on land in the eastern part of what is now Montgomery County.

For a brief time, the Osages attempted to maintain a boundary at the Verdigris River. The Verdigris flows from north to south through the center of Montgomery County. From the west the Elk River joins the Verdigris at a confluence slightly northwest of the geographical center of the county. In 1867 Frank and Fred Bunker established a primitive cattle camp on the west side of the Verdigris south of the confluence. Like the Osages, the Bunkers thought they were beyond the boundaries of civilization.

Early in 1869, however, settlers began to cross the Verdigris River, "at first under protest of the Indians, but the immense throng of settlers soon made all protests futile." Montgomery County was surveyed and organized in 1869; the governor appointed commissioners June 3.

Geography
The lowest point in the state of Kansas is located on the Verdigris River in Cherokee Township in Montgomery County (just southeast of Coffeyville), where it flows out of Kansas and into Oklahoma. Western portions of the county contain parts of the northern Cross Timbers eco-region, which separates the forested eastern portion of the United States with the Plains.

Google Maps uses Fawn Creek Township within Montgomery County as the zero-mile point of the United States. In other words, all directions to the "United States" will lead to a point in Fawn Creek.

Adjacent counties
 Wilson County (north)
 Neosho County (northeast)
 Labette County (east)
 Nowata County, Oklahoma (southeast)
 Washington County, Oklahoma (south)
 Chautauqua County (west)
 Elk County (northwest)

Bodies of water
Elk City Lake
Elk River
Havana Lake
Liberty Lakes
State Lake
Verdigris River

State parks
Elk City State Park
Montgomery County State Park

Demographics

The Coffeyville Micropolitan Statistical Area includes all of Montgomery County.

As of the 2000 census, there were 36,252 people, 14,903 households, and 9,955 families residing in the county.  The population density was 56 people per square mile (22/km2).  There were 17,207 housing units at an average density of 27 per square mile (10/km2).  The racial makeup of the county was 85.77% White, 6.07% Black or African American, 3.19% Native American, 0.47% Asian, 0.02% Pacific Islander, 1.13% from other races, and 3.34% from two or more races.  Hispanic or Latino of any race were 3.08% of the population.

There were 14,903 households, out of which 29.80% had children under the age of 18 living with them, 53.00% were married couples living together, 10.10% had a female householder with no husband present, and 33.20% were non-families. 29.70% of all households were made up of individuals, and 14.70% had someone living alone who was 65 years of age or older.  The average household size was 2.37 and the average family size was 2.93.

In the county, the population was spread out, with 25.00% under the age of 18, 8.60% from 18 to 24, 24.70% from 25 to 44, 23.30% from 45 to 64, and 18.30% who were 65 years of age or older.  The median age was 39 years. For every 100 females there were 93.20 males.  For every 100 females age 18 and over, there were 88.60 males.

The median income for a household in the county was $30,997, and the median income for a family was $38,516. Males had a median income of $29,745 versus $20,179 for females. The per capita income for the county was $16,421.  About 9.20% of families and 12.60% of the population were below the poverty line, including 16.80% of those under age 18 and 10.90% of those age 65 or over.

Government

Presidential elections

Like almost all of Kansas, Montgomery County is powerfully Republican. Since 1920 the only Democrat to carry the county has been Lyndon Johnson in 1964, although Alf Landon in a landslide loss of 1936 won Montgomery – his home county – by only thirty votes, whilst Herbert Hoover won the county in 1932 by only seventeen votes out of over nineteen thousand.

Laws
Following amendment to the Kansas Constitution in 1986, the county remained a prohibition, or "dry", county until 1998, when voters approved the sale of alcoholic liquor by the individual drink without a food sales requirement.

Transportation

Major highways
  U.S. Route 75
  U.S. Route 160
  U.S. Route 166
  U.S. Route 169
  U.S. Route 400

Airports
Coffeyville Municipal Airport
Independence Municipal Airport

Education

Colleges
 Coffeyville Community College
 Independence Community College

Unified school districts
 Caney Valley USD 436
 Coffeyville USD 445
 Independence USD 446
 Cherryvale USD 447

Communities

Cities

 Caney
 Cherryvale
 Coffeyville
 Dearing
 Elk City
 Havana
 Independence (county seat) 
 Liberty
 Tyro

Unincorporated communities

 Avian
 Blake
 Bolton
 Corbin
 Jefferson
 Sycamore
 Videtta Spur
 Wayside

Ghost towns
 Le Hunt

Townships
Montgomery County is divided into twelve townships.  The cities of Caney, Cherryvale, Coffeyville, and Independence are considered governmentally independent and are excluded from the census figures for the townships.  In the following table, the population center is the largest city (or cities) included in that township's population total, if it is of a significant size.

See also
 National Register of Historic Places listings in Montgomery County, Kansas

References

Notes

Further reading

 History of Montgomery County, Kansas; Lew Wallace Duncan; Press of Iola Register; 852 pages; 1903.
 Atlas and Plat Book of Montgomery County, Kansas; Kenyon Co; 36 pages; 1916.
 Historical Atlas of Montgomery County, Kansas; John P. Edwards; 34 pages; 1881.

External links

County
 
 Montgomery County - Directory of Public Officials
Maps
 Montgomery County Maps: Current, Historic, KDOT
 Kansas Highway Maps: Current, Historic, KDOT
 Kansas Railroad Maps: Current, 1996, 1915, KDOT and Kansas Historical Society

 
Kansas counties
1867 establishments in Kansas
Populated places established in 1867